Voorhies may refer to:

People
 Albert Voorhies (1829–1913), Lieutenant Governor of Louisiana
 Lark Voorhies (born 1974), American actress
 Paul W. Voorhies (1875–1952), American lawyer, prosecutor, and Michigan Attorney General
 Voorhies Trahan (1897–1963), American crawfish farming pioneer

Places
 Voorhies, Illinois, unincorporated community in Unity Township, Piatt County, Illinois, United States
 Voorhies, Iowa, unincorporated community in Lincoln Township, Black Hawk County, Iowa, United States
 D. W. Voorhies House, house located in St. Martinville, Louisiana
 Voorhies Castle, Victorian home located in Voorhies, Illinois

See also

 
 Voorhees (disambiguation)
 Voorheis (surname)
 Voorhis (surname)
 Justice Voorhies (disambiguation)